Ameristar Air Cargo, Inc. is an American passenger and cargo airline based in Dallas, Texas, USA. It operates passenger and cargo services in the Americas and acts as a broker to other cargo carriers. Its main base is Addison Airport in north Dallas, with hubs at Willow Run Airport and El Paso International Airport.

History 
The airline started operations on 4 September 2000. It is wholly owned by Tom Wachendorfer (airline president), who also owns Ameristar Jet Charter. Passenger operations began with Boeing 737-200 in September 2005.  Passengers include sports and entertainment industry celebrities, college athletic teams, and high-wealth individuals.

In 2008, an Ameristar 737-200 was painted for use in the film The Kingdom.

Fleet 

The Ameristar Charters fleet comprises the following aircraft (as of February 2022):

The Ameristar Air Cargo fleet previously included the following aircraft:
 2 Boeing 737-200C
 3 Falcon 20F

Previously operated by Ameristar Jet Charters:
 1 McDonnell Douglas MD-83
 2 Boeing 737-200
 1 Beechcraft 90
 5 Learjet 25
 10 Learjet 24

Accidents and incidents 

On August 24, 2001, an Ameristar Jet Charter Learjet 24, registration number N153TW, crashed after takeoff from Ithaca Tompkins Regional Airport destined for Jackson-Reynolds Municipal Airport, killing both pilots. The probable cause of the accident was spatial disorientation due to low visibility night-time flight conditions.

On September 29, 2003, an Ameristar Jet Charter Learjet 24, performing Flight 982 from El Paso International Airport to Del Rio International Airport overran the runway on landing. The probable cause of the accident was a higher than recommended landing speed. The plane plunged into flames after exhausting the length of the runway, killing one of two crew members.

On January 9, 2007, an Ameristar Jet Charter Learjet 24, performing Flight 878 from Laredo International Airport to Miguel Hidalgo y Costilla Guadalajara International Airport impacted terrain while on descent towards its destination, killing both pilots on board.

On March 8, 2017, an Ameristar Jet Charter McDonnell Douglas MD-83 (the same aircraft pictured above) performing Flight 9363 from Willow Run Airport to Washington Dulles International Airport and carrying the University of Michigan basketball band, spirit staff, and team to the Big Ten Tournament overran the runway at Willow Run in Ypsilanti after aborting takeoff in high wind and above V1 speed. During the takeoff roll, a fault with the elevator system prevented normal takeoff rotation, forcing the takeoff to be rejected at high speed once it became clear that the aircraft could not fly. The aircraft ultimately came to a rest just past a perimeter road with the fuselage intact but with the undercarriage significantly damaged and the nose gear broken off. There was one minor injury sustained.

References

External links

Ameristar Jet Charter (Geoblocking outside the USA) 

Regional airlines of the United States
Airlines established in 2000
Airlines based in Texas
Cargo airlines of the United States
2000 establishments in Texas